Joseph Taeymans (27 January 1899 – 14 June 1971) was a Belgian footballer. He played in one match for the Belgium national football team in 1925.

References

External links
 

1899 births
1971 deaths
Belgian footballers
Belgium international footballers
Place of birth missing
Association footballers not categorized by position